The Blue Note 7 are a jazz septet formed in 2008 in honor of the 70th anniversary of Blue Note Records. The group consists of Peter Bernstein (guitar), Bill Charlap (piano), Ravi Coltrane (tenor saxophone), Lewis Nash (drums), Nicholas Payton (trumpet), Peter Washington (bass), and Steve Wilson (alto saxophone, flute).

The group recorded an album in 2008, entitled Mosaic, which was released in 2009 on Blue Note/EMI, and toured the United States in promotion of the album from January until April 2009. The group plays the music of Blue Note from various artists, with arrangements by members of the band and Renee Rosnes.

Band members

 Peter Bernstein – guitar
 Bill Charlap – piano
 Ravi Coltrane – tenor saxophone
 Lewis Nash – drums
 Nicholas Payton – trumpet
 Peter Washington – bass
 Steve Wilson – alto saxophone, flute

Albums
 Mosaic: A Celebration of Blue Note Records (Blue Note Records/EMI, 2009)

References

External links
The Blue Note 7 official website
[ allmusic entry]
http://www.bluenotesix-vienna.at/content/29/29/biografie_blue_note_six.htm

American jazz ensembles
Septets
Post-bop ensembles
Jazz supergroups
Musical groups established in 2008
Blue Note Records artists